Englevale is a census-designated place and unincorporated community in Ransom County, North Dakota, United States. Its population was 40 as of the 2010 census. The community was initially named Marshall after landowner Marshall T. Davis; it was later renamed for Mathias L. Engel, a promoter for the community.

Demographics

References

Census-designated places in Ransom County, North Dakota
Census-designated places in North Dakota
Unincorporated communities in North Dakota
Unincorporated communities in Ransom County, North Dakota